Airton (also known as Airton-in-Craven) is a small village and civil parish in the Craven district of North Yorkshire, England, situated  north-west of Skipton. The village had a population of 175 according to the 2001 Census, increasing to 228 at the 2011 Census., increasing to 227 at the 2021 Census.

History

Listed as Airtone in the Domesday Book, the village takes its name from the River Aire which runs along its eastern edge. In the late 1600s a significant Quaker community developed in the village around the Friends Meeting House. In use for the majority of its history, this building was restored between 2010 and 2012 and continues to host an active Quaker meeting.

Other significant buildings in Airton include a squatter's cottage on the village green, a former Methodist Chapel (now closed) and an old mill on the River Aire which is in use as a private residence. The old cotton mill was given listed status in 1989. There is no pub or Post Office in the village; however there is a Farm Shop and Tea Room at Town End Farm on the road to Malham.

Airton lies in the Ecclesiastical Parish of St. Michael and All Angels, Kirkby Malham.

Transport 
There is a bus stop in the village with daily links to Malham and Skipton. Also, the local roads link the village to the A65.

Tourism 

The village is in the Yorkshire Dales National Park and lies on the tourist route to Malham Cove and Malham Tarn. The Pennine Way passes around the edge of the village, alongside the river.  The Way of the Roses cycle route passes through the village on the road between Settle and Grassington.

References

External links

Village and area web site
Airton history pages

Villages in North Yorkshire
Civil parishes in North Yorkshire